Aethra is a genus of crabs in the family Aethridae, containing the following species:
 Aethra edentata Edmondson, 1951
 Aethra scruposa (Linnaeus, 1764)
 Aethra scutata Smith, 1869
 Aethra seychellensis Takeda, 1975
 †Aethra stalennyii Ossó, 2018

References

Crabs